The 2023 ICC Women's T20 World Cup Europe Qualifier is a cricket tournament that forms part of the qualification process for the 2024 ICC Women's T20 World Cup. In an expanded qualification pathway for women's cricket in Europe, this will be the first time that a second division has been included. The first stage of the tournament will be Division Two, which will be played in Jersey in May and June 2023. Six teams will contest Division Two, with the top two sides progressing to Division One, which will be played in Spain in September 2023. The top two teams in Division One will advance to the global qualifier event to be played in 2024.

Teams

Division Two

Division One

References

Europe qualifier
2023 in women's cricket
Associate international cricket competitions in 2023